= Gîsca oil field =

Oil field in the Black Sea

Gîsca
- Country: Romania
- Region: Black Sea
- Block: Pelican
- Offshore/onshore: offshore
- Operator: Sterling Resources

Field history
- Discovery: 2010
- Start of development: 2014
- Start of production: 2015

Production
- Current production of oil: 1,000 barrels per day (~50,000 t/a)
- Estimated oil in place: 2.9 million tonnes (~ 3.3×10^{6} m^{3} or 21 million bbl)

The Gîsca oil field is an oil field located on the continental shelf of the Black Sea. It was discovered in 2010 and developed by Sterling Resources. It will begin production in 2015 and will produce oil. The total proven reserves of the Gîsca oil field are around 21 million barrels (2.9 million tonnes), and production is centered on 1,000 barrels per day (160 m^{3}/d).
